Sacrebleu is the debut studio album by French electronic music producer Dimitri from Paris. It was first released on 11 June 1996 by Yellow Productions in France and later released by Atlantic Records in North America and EastWest Records in Europe and Japan.

Several of the album's tracks sample from lounge and bossa nova tracks of the 1950s and 1960s, as well as quotes from films such as Breakfast at Tiffany's, La Dolce Vita, 8½ and The Party.

Composition
The Prologue opens: "Hello There and Welcome to the exciting world of Hip. This is a new departure in language instruction for English-speaking people who want to talk to – and be understood by – jazz musicians, hipsters, beatniks, juvenile delinquents and the criminal fringe." This is a sample from Del Close John Brent's 1959 comedy spoken word album How to Speak Hip.
Track 2, Sacré Français! samples Cal Tjader's track João from his 1964 album Soul Sauce. Quotes are taken from Gillian Hills' 1960 track Cha Cha Stop and Valéry's 1964 track Vous Dansez Mademoiselle.
Track 3, Monsieur Dimitri Joue Du Stylophone samples The Three Suns's version of Sleep Walk from the album Fever & Smoke.
Track 4, Nothing to lose, uses Claudine Longet's vocal performance from Peter Sellers' The Party.
Track 6, Reveries, samples "Half-Forgotten Daydreams" by British composer John Cameron .
Track 10, Une Very Stylish Fille samples Teddy Randazzo's 1966 track The Girl from U.N.C.L.E. Sampled quotes from Breakfast at Tiffany's are also included on the track: the character Mrs. Failenson's (Patricia Neal) quote "I am a very stylish girl" is heard throughout the track, as well as the character Holly Golightly (Audrey Hepburn) asking "How do I look?" with the character Paul "Fred" Varjak (George Peppard) replying "Very good. I must say I'm amazed." This track was also used by Volvo for a commercial.
The second part of Nothing To Lose (Lounge Instrumentale), also titled separately as Toujours L'Amore, samples this quote by character Sylvia Rankinfrom (Anita Ekberg) from Fellini's La Dolce Vita,: "I like lots of things, but there are three things I like most: Love, love and love." The song ends with a sample from the beginning of Fellini's 8½, which says, "Bella ragazza! Americana, eh?"
Free Ton Style samples Mysteries of the World by MFSB in 1980

Critical reception

In a contemporary review of Sacrebleu, Will Hermes of Entertainment Weekly wrote, "Like French fromage, it often smells funny, but when it's good, it's marvelous." Retrospectively, John Bush of AllMusic described the record as "a breezy collection of what could be loosely termed house music", albeit one "indebted to a variety of intriguing styles reminiscent of the Continent around the mid-part of the century", and praised it as an "immensely enjoyable album".

Track listing

References

External links
 

1996 albums
Dimitri from Paris albums
Yellow Productions albums